Maryse Guy Mitsouko (born Maryse Guy; 1943 – March 1995) was a Eurasian artist and actress. She was mostly billed as Mitsouko.  She made her debut in Douce Violence in 1962.   Mitsouko is most known for playing a minor Bond girl Madame La Porte in Thunderball (where her voice was dubbed by Catherine Clemence) as well as appearing in several other Eurospy films such as Agent 077 - Mission Bloody Mary.
She killed herself in 1995.

Filmography

References

External links

1943 births
1995 deaths
French film actresses
20th-century French actresses
Female suicides
1995 suicides
Suicides by firearm in France